This page summarises the Australia national soccer team fixtures and results in 2012.

Summary
The year started with Australia topping their group in the third round of the AFC World Cup Qualifiers.
During the fourth round, Australia had collected just five points from the first four games.
Australia finished the year by debuting in the preliminary rounds of the East Asian Cup and successfully topped the group to qualify for the finals.

Record

Match results
All times are in the Western Australian time zone, UTC+8.

Friendlies

World Cup qualifiers

East Asian Cup

Player statistics

Appearances and goals

|}

Goal scorers
Correct as of 9 December 2015 (v. ).

Disciplinary record

Notes

References

External links
 Australia: Fixtures and Results

2012 in Australian soccer
2012
Australia